The Borrowers Afloat is a children's  fantasy novel by Mary Norton, published in 1959 by Dent in the UK and Harcourt in the US. It was the third of five books in a series that is usually called The Borrowers, inaugurated by The Borrowers in 1952.

Plot
The Clock family are Borrowers living in the house of a human boy, Tom. The Borrowers worry that they will starve because Tom and his uncle are moving away. They need to leave, but Tom's pet weasel or ferret is outside the door. Luckily, the animal still has the bell that Tom put on it, but they know they cannot outrun such a swift animal. Just when things are looking grim, another Borrower, Spiller, returns via a secret passage. He has come through the drains underneath the house. Spiller admits that he has not told the rest of the Borrowers about the drains because they never asked.

While deciding where to go, Spiller tells them that they might go to Little Fordham which is actually a replica village.  The place has been a bit of a legend with all Borrowers: a whole village made for Borrower-size residents with plenty of food from the visiting big people.

Spiller lets them stay in one of his hideouts, a tea kettle, while he investigates the matter for them.  During the wait, rainwater sets the kettle adrift downstream.  The Clocks decide that their best chances are to hope that Spiller will realize what has happened and find them. Additional adventures occur, and they lose the kettle some time after it gets stuck in some rubbish.

While still on the river, Mild Eye, the gypsy who nearly caught them before, discovers them. The Clock family is trapped; as none of them can swim.

Adaptations

The Return of the Borrowers: The 1993 sequel to The Borrowers, this BBC TV series starred Ian Holm, Penelope Wilton and Rebecca Callard. The series was adapted from the third and fourth Borrowers novels, The Borrowers Afield and its sequel The Borrowers Aloft.

References 

The Borrowers
Children's fantasy novels
British children's novels
English fantasy novels
J. M. Dent books
Low fantasy novels
Novels set in England
1959 fantasy novels
1959 British novels
1959 children's books
British novels adapted into television shows